Chris Orrick is a Detroit rapper best known for his albums on the Mello Music label. His songs frequently center on themes of alcoholism and depression.

Orrick began his career with the Michigan-based hip hop collective BLAT! Pack. He originally went by the name Red Pill, but he abandoned the name after it became associated with reactionary communities.

References 

Rappers from Detroit
Living people
Year of birth missing (living people)